Norman Snow (March 29, 1950 – November 28, 2022) was an American actor who is best known for his role as Xur in the science fiction film The Last Starfighter (1984).

Snow is acknowledged in the acting community as an accomplished character actor, with the vast majority of his work being roles in television series since the late 1970s, in series such as Man from Atlantis, Quantum Leap, L.A. Law and Beverly Hills, 90210. A highlight of Snow's television career is the role of Torin in an episode of Star Trek: The Next Generation called "Rightful Heir" during the series' sixth season.

His film career was more sporadic with roles ranging from The Last Starfighter in 1984, to the FBI agent Springfield in the 1986 Michael Mann 'Hannibal Lecktor' thriller Manhunter. Snow returned to cinema screens in 2001 in the film Moonbeams.

Filmography

References

External links

1950 births
2022 deaths
American male film actors
American male soap opera actors
American male television actors
Juilliard School alumni
Male actors from Little Rock, Arkansas